Several ships of the Royal Navy have been named HMS Defence:

 , launched in 1763, fought in many battles in the American Revolutionary War, the French Revolutionary Wars and the Napoleonic Wars.
  was a 74-gun ship of the line, built in 1815 and broken up in 1857.
 , launched in 1861, was an ironclad scrapped in 1935.
 , launched in 1907, was an armoured cruiser sunk at the Battle of Jutland.
 Defence, a Minotaur-class cruiser was launched in 1945 but work on her was suspended until 1954. In 1957 she was renamed .

Royal Navy ship names